The CMLL Universal Championship 2012 (Campeonato Universal in Spanish) was a professional wrestling tournament produced by the Consejo Mundial de Lucha Libre (CMLL) promotion, which took place over three shows between August 17 and August 31, 2012, in Arena México, Mexico City, Mexico. The CMLL Universal Championship is an annual tournament of CMLL Champions that was first held in 2009.

Background
The tournament featured 15 professional wrestling matches under single-elimination tournament rules, which means that wrestlers were eliminated when they lose a match. There were no specific storylines that build to the tournament, which has been held annually since 2009. All male "non-regional" CMLL champions at the time of the tournament were involved in the tournament with the exception of the reigning CMLL World Mini-Estrella and Mexican National Lightweight Champions, who have never taken part in the tournament. Regionally promoted championships such as the CMLL Arena Coliseo Tag Team Championship and the Occidente championships promoted in Guadalajara, Jalisco were not included in the tournament; only titles that have been defended in CMLL's main venue Arena Mexico were included. The tournament was divided into two qualifying blocks, which took place on August 17 and August 24, while the finals took place on August 31, 2012.

2012 Universal Championship tournament
When CMLL announced the 2012 tournament the following champions were eligible to participate:

Reigning NWA World Historic Middleweight Champion Prince Devitt and CMLL World Lightweight Champion Virus did not take part in the tournament. For the second year in a row, New Japan Pro-Wrestling representative and reigning IWGP Heavyweight Champion Hiroshi Tanahashi entered the tournament as an outsider.

Block A

Block A took place on August 17, 2012, and featured eight champions wrestling for a place in the finals.

Block B

Block B took place on August 24, 2012, and featured eight champions wrestling for a place in the finals.

Finals
The finals of the tournament took place on August 31, 2012, and saw El Terrible defeat Tanahashi two falls to one to become the 2012 Universal Champion.

References

2012 in professional wrestling
CMLL Universal Championship